The prime minister of Tuvalu is the head of government of Tuvalu. According to Tuvalu's constitution, the prime minister must always be a member of the parliament, and is elected by parliament in a secret ballot. Because there are no political parties in Tuvalu, any member of parliament can be nominated for the role. Following the parliamentary vote the governor-general of Tuvalu (as head of state) is responsible for swearing in as the prime minister the person who commands the confidence of a majority of members of parliament.

The office of prime minister was established when Tuvalu gained independence in 1978, although the post is sometimes considered to be a continuation of the earlier office of chief minister, which was created in 1975. If the prime minister dies, as has happened on one occasion, the deputy prime minister becomes acting prime minister until a new one is elected by parliament. The prime minister can lose his office by resigning, being defeated in a motion of no confidence by parliament, or losing his seat in a parliamentary election. 

Several former prime ministers have been appointed the governor-general of Tuvalu.

Kausea Natano is the incumbent prime minister, since 19 September 2019.

List of prime ministers

Notes

 Tuilimu served as acting prime minister following the death of Ionatana.

See also
 Governor-General of Tuvalu
 Politics of Tuvalu

References

Politics of Tuvalu
 
Tuvalu
1978 establishments in Tuvalu